Aleksandrowo may refer to the following places:
Aleksandrowo, Bydgoszcz County in Kuyavian-Pomeranian Voivodeship (north-central Poland)
Aleksandrowo, Włocławek County in Kuyavian-Pomeranian Voivodeship (north-central Poland)
Aleksandrowo, Żnin County in Kuyavian-Pomeranian Voivodeship (north-central Poland)
Aleksandrowo, Sejny County in Podlaskie Voivodeship (north-east Poland)
Aleksandrowo, Siemiatycze County in Podlaskie Voivodeship (north-east Poland)
Aleksandrowo, Suwałki County in Podlaskie Voivodeship (north-east Poland)
Aleksandrowo, Mława County in Masovian Voivodeship (east-central Poland)
Aleksandrowo, Nowy Dwór Mazowiecki County in Masovian Voivodeship (east-central Poland)
Aleksandrowo, Gmina Troszyn in Masovian Voivodeship (east-central Poland)
Aleksandrowo, Płock County in Masovian Voivodeship (east-central Poland)
Aleksandrowo, Przasnysz County in Masovian Voivodeship (east-central Poland)
Aleksandrowo, Gostyń County in Greater Poland Voivodeship (west-central Poland)
Aleksandrowo, Szamotuły County in Greater Poland Voivodeship (west-central Poland)
Aleksandrowo, Wągrowiec County in Greater Poland Voivodeship (west-central Poland)
Aleksandrowo, Warmian-Masurian Voivodeship (north Poland)